Lepiota subincarnata is a gilled mushroom of the genus Lepiota in the order Agaricales. It is known to contain amatoxins and consuming this fungus can be potentially lethal. The species is found in Asia, Europe, and North America, in woods as well as richly soiled parks. It was first described scientifically by the Danish mycologist Jakob Emanuel Lange in 1940. Bon and Boiffard described Lepiota josserandii in 1974, which turned out to be the same species.

The mushroom's cap is light red to red-brown and cream-colored closer to the margin. The gills are whitish and the flesh is white to pinkish towards the top. The stem may be slightly larger at the base, cream-colored with patches of the cap color. The odor is somewhat fruity and the taste of the poisonous mushroom is unpleasant.

See also
 List of deadly fungi
 List of Lepiota species

References

External links

subincarnata
Deadly fungi
Fungi of Asia
Poisonous fungi
Fungi of Europe
Fungi of North America
Fungi described in 1940